There are numerous reportedly haunted places in Colombia. This list is alphabetized by province or territory of these places and then alphabetically within each province or territory.

Antioquia
La Catedral, Medellín: A short-lived prison, built to incarcerate Pablo Escobar. Now a monastery
A three floor building located in Santa Cruz neighborhood, part of the northwestern comunes of Medellín.

Atlántico
Reports of a ghost bride, in La Curva del Diablo (The devil's curve) in Puerto Colombia. A team from a local TV channel which was recreating this story at the same place claims to have captured actual footage of the ghost.

Bogotá

Bogotá City Hall or also known as Liévano Palace
Bolívar Square: José Raimundo Russi was executed here, and his ghost haunts the square.
An apartment building located in Chapinero where Campo Elias Delgado killed his mother and six of his neighbours, before perpetrating what is known as The Pozzetto Massacre.
A family residence in Ciudad Montes, in Puente Aranda district. 
El Virrey Park, where Luis Colmenares died under unknown circumstances. Strange occurrences have been reported .
The Colombian Institute of Anthropology and History headquarters
The streets around the campus of La Salle University host the spectre of a vengeful woman who was rejected by a Spanish priest.
Under the main altar of La Concepción Church, three knocks are reported to be heard whenever a nun is about to die.
Manuelita Sáenz House
The Silva Poetry House
La Inmaculada Cemetery: There is an urban legend of a phantom passenger.
On the corner of Calle de La Esperanza and Calle de La Parra sits a house where legend says disturbing satanic rituals took place in. In 1999, a local newspaper reported on the story of a security guard who claimed to have seen a two-meter tall white humanoid on the patio while he was there by himself.
Calle de la Peña: An old manor in this street has a terrible reputation. Apparently, there's a ghost in the patio that had cursed the existence of everyone who has the misfortune of seeing it. Legend says that even Simon Bolívar got to see it when he was escaping from an assassination attempt. The husband of the actual owner hung himself after various encounters with the infamous ghost; he left a note to his wife revealing the ghost's horrible secret, although the wife refuses to reveal it publicly.
Calle del Sol (The Street of the Sun) was built in 1917 as a lodge for a religious community, but became the headquarters for the Colombian Intelligence Service (now DAS) in 1945, which was used to incarcerate and torture prisoners during La Violencia. Now an apartment complex, some residents report hearing screams, moans, laughs, punches and whippings, preceded by lights and strange fogs. Some workers at a restaurant, also located on the dungeon's location, report poltergeist activity such as toilets flushing by themselves, things changing location on their own, and an invisible force in the kitchen area which pats workers on their backs. Supposedly these are the souls of those who were tortured, or perhaps a witch who was the mother of one of these prisoners.
The Casa Sámano Museum used to belong to Juan Sámano, Viceroy of New Granada. Publicly recognized as one of the most hated figures of Colombian history; when he was alive, he used to spit, step on and kick those he did not like, which he has continued doing in the afterlife. Security guards have heard steps on the second floor and seen/heard doors which appear to open by themselves.
The Gilberto Alzate Avendaño Foundation is reported to be haunted by the ghost of Viceroy José Manuel de Ezpeleta, nicknamed "The Green Jacket Ghost". Legend says the ghost used to knock three times on a wall on the second floor and then he proceeded to disappear.
Gregario Vásquez de Arce y Ceballos House has the benevolent ghost of the owner within its premises, he appears in the basement and the backyard, wearing a long black cape.
The José Caicedo Rojas House, also known as The Goblin's Mansion, is haunted by a goblin named Baltazar. Legend says the goblin is the spirit of a newborn, who was thrown into the backyard's well by his single mother, afraid of being burned at the stake of the Holy Office's laws.
The Jose Raimundo Russi House is where Manuelito Ferro was murdered, with Russi being charged for the crime. Some neighbors have said they hear the screams of Ferro and the sound of his stabbings.
The Juan Montúfar House has been a boarding school since colonial times, and is still being run by Montúfar's descendants. Students who have lived in the school have felt ghostly presences and drastic temperature drops, alongside hearing footsteps in the middle of the night.	
Las Aguas Cloister is a former convent where people claim to hear noises and see shadows in the south-eastern portion of the backyard, which the nuns used as a burial place.
Palomar del Príncipe Park is haunted by a blonde, blue-eyed boy, who used to feed doves 300 years ago, this boy usually appears at dawn. A legend says that those who are cruel to the doves will be tormented by the soul of the boy.
The Rosa Florida House is haunted by General Sardá, who was loyal to Simón Bolívar, and who manifests himself with the sound of his boots stepping on the sidewalks.
The Calle 100 Bridge that crosses over Carrera Séptima, where some local cab drivers avoid driving in. Legend says some of them got scared by the ghost of a nun who was killed near this spot.

Bolívar

Naval Museum of the Caribbean,  Cartagena: A tourist took a photograph of the ghost of an old man, but nothing appeared on the building's security cameras.
The former San Pablo Psychiatric Hospital in Cartagena.
Santa Clara Hotel, Cartagena: Founded in 1621, this large building is a former monastery. The ghost stories made it harder for the renovator to get and keep workers.

Boyacá
Las Nieves Church, Tunja: A legend of a levitating lantern, making a trip between Las Nieves and the Metropolitan Cathedral. 
San Francisco de Asis Church, Tunja: Claims of a large dog that barks and howls at late hours, dragging chains and bright eyes.
There are stories that old town in Tunja was haunted by the ghosts of Franciscan and Dominican friars.
Los Cojines del Zaque, a muisca sanctuary located in the hills of Tunja, where some strange phenomena has been reported.

Caldas

Cerro de Oro, Manizales: A story that if candy is placed over a car, ghosts of children will approach the car and take the candy.
La Argentina neighborhood, Manizales: A story of a horseman who used to provide milk to the neighbors whose ghost allegedly still gallops around the streets.
Manizales City Centre: Karina Albornoz was a greengrocer killed by her husband in 1941, who allegedly haunts the building.
San Jorge neighborhood, Manizales: A lady who wears red heels is said to haunt an old house in this neighborhood.

Caquetá
An old manor, known by locals as the Horror House, located between La Salle School and La Consolata neighborhood in Florencia.

Cauca
Párraga, La Sierra: stones were thrown to the township's roofs, which was blamed on a deaf-mute woman.

Cundinamarca

Marroquín Castle, Chía: A tall woman dressed in black, called "La Zancona", is one of several ghosts claimed to inhabit the location.
Salto de Tequendama House, San Antonio del Tequendama: A former hotel near the Tequendama Falls, a place with a high rate of suicides. There has been claims  of a headless man seen walking around the terrace or watching from the windows.
Siberia, La Calera: Visitors are said to have heard children singing, though there could be a natural explanation.

Huila
La Jagua, Garzón: Believed to be haunted by witches.

Magdalena

Manuel Varela House also known as The Devil's house, Ciénaga: An abandoned republican mansion, home to a physician Manuel Varela, who legend says sacrificed a souls to the devil in return for wealth. Witches, ghosts of workers, a gold-toothed black boy who smokes tobacco while riding a tricycle, and even the devil himself are said to haunt the mansion and its surrounding grounds.

Meta

El Manantial neighborhood, Villavicencio: Unknown if it is a goblin or the spirit of a boy who appeared dead next to a wetland, many people have felt attacked by this presence or simply get to see unusual events inside their houses.

Norte de Santander
 An old blue house built in El Páramo neighborhood, in Cúcuta was the home of Egon Bernhard, a nazi sympathizer who arrived from Germany before the Second World War. Bernhard was found shot dead in 1987 and now his grandson lives in the house, which now threatens to collapse. The grandson claims a girl haunts the upper floors. He has heard her moaning, and tries calming her down by "giving her" a cup of water, although sometimes the task isn't successful and the girl gets rebellious. Sometimes she looks for him in his bedroom and approaches him slowly, just to vanish when she gets very close to his bed.
La Gabarra, Tibú: The Restrepo family home was taken by the AUC and turned into a headquarter where huge parties and ominous crimes took place, the crimes in question involved the torture, hook-hanging and chainsaw-quartering of prisoners within the building. The new owner says that more than 150 prisoners  died there during a four-year period, so he suspects the number of corpses buried inside the house is also big. For him and his family it is only possible to sleep during daytime since they claim that at nighttime they can see two black dogs walking around the two cells built in the patio. They also claim to have heard screams, moans and whispers, alongside seeing moving shadows.
Ocaña: Antón García de Bonilla, a legendary landlord, still lures in the town's old streets.

Quindío

Armenia City Hall: The spirits of some of the previous workers scare the surveillance, specially on the parking lots, the fourth and the sixth floors and the restrooms. Mass offered several times to put those souls to rest.
Banco Popular, Armenia: A former bank manager came out to write about the strange occurrences that happened in the bank thirty years ago. One of the guards told him about hearing heavy footsteps, coughings, desks being opened and closed. Suddenly the sounds became more frequent, now adding voices and bangs. Another guard reported to watch a typewriter operating by itself. Apparently, when the superiors made fun of the ghost story, The first guard told the manager the spirit got angry and locked itself inside the guards' room. The guard decided to deal with the ghost, throwing holy water at it. A violent stream blew itself to the adjacent wall, and the phenomenons never happened again.

Risaralda

Diocesano School, Dosquebradas: A nun roaming in the corridors, a man dressed in black and a playful girl on the second floor have been seen in the building at late hours.
Hernando Vélez Marulanda neighborhood, Pereira: A school in this neighborhood has its own ghost nun who appears in the restrooms. Suspicions are that the presence is indicating the site of a guaca.
 A Horror House in Pereira appears to be haunted for real. The owners, a pair of brothers, found an abandoned old house; they found it so scary that they decided to put the attraction there. When the attraction opened, the brothers had a hard time hiring guards, since some of them quit when they claimed to have heard strange steps and moving things.

Santander

A 100 years old house in Bucaramanga, site of a guaca and where a lot of paranormal activity scared three generations of a family. Voices, shadows, an entity whose hair flew with an untempestive wind (apparently, a witch), a tree of Spanish limes that used to throw its fruits with violence, footsteps and some other occurrences which partially ended when the family dug out some hair and Guane gold pieces from the patio.
Bucaramanga City Hall: Surveillance have reported strange light rows in the second floor, where the City Department of Health functions.
El Centro township, Barrancabermeja: A beautiful american nurse was known to be raped and murdered in this area. Her ghost likes to appear in front of lustful men who approach to flirt with her, but they pass out when they get to see her real face.
El Patio de las Brujas (The Witches' Patio) in Girón got its name after an ominous happening took place in there. Legend recalls that in 1925, a farmer was found almost dead by his family. When he got up, he affirmed to have found a horseman, who was no one but the devil itself, surrounded by a black dog, a woman and some vultures (which folklore recounts as witches). The woman happened to be a neighbor whose love was not corresponded by the farmer.
One of the bridges of the old town of Girón has a ghostly but peaceful horseman known as Antón García, whose horse makes first impression by its gallops; when the victim cannot see where the gallops come from, then they turned to be in front of the shadow of Antón.
La Llorona makes herself present in Las Nieves creek, Girón, with her hair reaching her ankles and her notorious weeping.
The Headless Nazareno that haunts Girón in Easter times and after 11 pm. It is known to levitate in Calle de La Calavera or Calle del Sagrado Corazón and disappears in Las Nieves Chapel. Last sighting was documented in 1992.

Sucre

Hacienda El Palmar, San Onofre: El Palmar is a recently abandoned estate, usurped by paramilitary forces and used as a headquarter. An important paramilitar chief, known by the alias 'Cadena', committed abominable crimes inside the estate and many of his victims remain there in mass graves. The caretaker and her family have felt shadows, moans, and water running in the bathroom when no one is using it. Also, there is a shed between the barn and the corral which the caretaker insists to keep close, but appears open with no explanation. Locals added El Palmar is haunted by the souls of those who died there, or even 'Cadena' but this can't be proven since Cadena's fate remain unknown and some claim he's still alive.

Valle del Cauca

Cemetery of El Cerrito: Guards report strange shadows. A couple of them one night received a woman who asked to stay for five minutes when the guards were about to leave; Ten minutes passed, and when they got inside to look for her, no one was there.
Central Cemetery of Palmira: A boy that sits on his grave has been seen by the guards.
Santa Lucía township, Tuluá: There are rumors of the ghost of a 24-year-old woman who was raped and dismembered.
Telepacífico Studios, Cali: The surveillance, Camera staff, and other workers are accustomed to the eerie presences that roam around the whole building. On a nightshift, a journalist have captured what it seems to be an invisible force opening and closing the door where she was working.
Versalles: A school building that used to be an orphanage and a boarding school have been reported as haunted by some of the vigilants.

References

 
Colombian folklore
Colombia
Haunted